Austria competed at the 1924 Winter Olympics in Chamonix, France.

Medalists

Figure skating

Men

Women

Pairs

References

 Olympic Winter Games 1924, full results by sports-reference.com

Nations at the 1924 Winter Olympics
1924
1924 in Austrian sport